This is a list of bridges and tunnels on the National Register of Historic Places in the U.S. state of Oregon.  It includes a number of viaducts which are considered bridges.  A list of bridges, tunnels, and viaducts of the Historic Columbia River Highway is included.



Gray shading indicates that a structure has been removed from the Register. Often the road listed in the "location" column now parallels the bridge on a new one, and the old bridge is closed to traffic.

Bridges and tunnels besides in Historic Columbia River Highway

Historic Columbia River Highway bridges and tunnels
These are contributing structures in the Historic Columbia River Highway, which was listed on the National Register of Historic Places in 1983, and was further designated a National Historic Landmark District in 2000.

See also
List of Oregon covered bridges
List of bridges in the United States

References
 (does not include places no longer listed)
Oregon National Register List, November 10, 2005. Retrieved June 18, 2011 (includes listed dates of removed places)

External links

 
Oregon
Bridges
Bridges